Kaeng Khoi Line is a railway line of Greater Bangkok Commuter rail, operated by State Railway of Thailand (SRT). The line is all double track. There are three commuter train services on the line. Main destinations such as Rangsit, Ayutthaya, Saraburi, and Kaeng Khoi.

Services 
 Commuter train no. 339 Bangkok-Kaeng Khoi (diesel multiple unit)
 Commuter train no. 341 Bangkok-Kaeng Khoi

See also 
 Greater Bangkok Commuter rail
 Lopburi Line
 Northern Line (Thailand)
 Ubon Ratchathani Main Line
 Nong Khai Main Line
 Kaeng Khoi-Bua Yai Shortcut Main Line
 Northeastern Line (Thailand)
 Kaeng Khoi Junction Railway Station
 SRT Dark Red Line
 Bangkok Elevated Road and Train System (Hopewell)

References 

Railway lines in Thailand
Metre gauge railways in Thailand